The tomb of Sher Shah Suri is in the Sasaram town of Bihar state, India. The tomb was built in memory of Emperor Sher Shah Suri, a Pathan from Bihar who defeated the Mughal Empire and founded the Suri Empire in northern India. He died in an accidental gunpowder explosion in the fort of Kalinjar on 10th day of Rabi' al-awwal, A.H. 952 or 13 May 1545 AD.

Architecture
His tomb is an example of Indo-Islamic architecture, it was designed by the architect  Mir Muhammad Aliwal Khan and built between 1540 and 1545, this red sandstone mausoleum (122 ft high), which stands in the middle of an artificial lake, which is nearly square, is known as the second Taj Mahal of India. The tomb stands at the centre of the lake on a square stone plinth with domed kiosks, chhatris at each of its corners, further there are stone banks and stepped moorings on all sides of the plinth, which is connected to the mainland through a wide stone bridge. The main tomb is built on octagonal plan, topped by a dome, 22-metre in span and surrounded ornamental domed kiosks which were once covered in coloured glazed tile work. The lake around the tomb is seen as a development in the Afghan phase of Sultan architecture by the Sur Dynasty.

The tomb was built during the lifetime of Sher Shah as well as the reign of his son Islam Shah. An inscription dates its completion to 16 August 1545, three months after the death of Sher Shah.

In 1778, William Hodges became among the first British landscape painters to visit India. While there, he made careful observations of the art and architecture he encountered. He published an illustrated book about his travels in India in 1794. In his book, he described the Tomb of Sher Shah Suri in detail.

Gallery

Current

Historic

Plaque, info , tablet

How to reach Sher Shah Tomb?

Roadway: By road is easily accessible from any corner of Sasaram city. Rauja road and rauja Road No. 1 (Prabhakar road) are the main roads to reach here.

Railway: Sasaram is a major railway station between Varanasi (Banaras) and Gaya. Sasaram can be easily reached from different states of the country by direct or by changing train from Deendayal Upadhyaya station (Mughal Sarai).

Airways: Nearest airport is Gaya.  Banaras is also close.  Patna can also be an option.

References

 Tomb of Sher Shah by R Chopra, Indo-Iranica Vol. 10 (2)

External links

 Sher Shah Suri Tomb wikimapia

Sur Empire
Buildings and structures in Bihar
Mausoleums in India
Buildings and structures completed in 1554
Sandstone buildings in India
Monuments and memorials in Bihar
1554 establishments in India
Tourist attractions in Rohtas district